Jean Antoine Bost (March 4, 1817 in Moutier-Grandval, canton of Bern-1 November 1881) was a Swiss Calvinist pastor and musician. His father, Ami Bost, was also a Pastor. He learned the piano with Franz Liszt.

In 1840, he gave up his musical career and he became Pastor in La Force, village of the Dordogne valley of France. In 1846, he inaugurated the new temple and decided to build the Asylum of his dreams by the temple. 'La Famille' (the Family) was inaugurated on May 24, 1848. It was immediately made available to children, orphans, disabled, incurables. He created 9 asylums during his life.  In 1861, he married Eugénie Ponterie.

He was elected as a member of the American Philosophical Society in 1864.

The Asylum has since flourished to become the John Bost Foundation where over 1000 people with a wide variety of disabilities live.

References

External links
John Bost Foundation
Establishments of John Bost at Laforce, The Romance of Charity by John De Liefde (1867)
John Bost, Pastor and Philanthropist, The Quiver (1883)

1817 births
1881 deaths
People from the Bernese Jura
Swiss Calvinist and Reformed Christians
French Calvinist and Reformed ministers
Swiss pianists
Swiss male musicians
19th-century pianists
19th-century male musicians
19th-century musicians